Courdon "Cory" Higgins (born June 14, 1989) is an American professional basketball player for FC Barcelona of the Liga ACB and the EuroLeague.

High school
Higgins played high school basketball at Monte Vista High School, in his hometown Danville, California.

College career
Higgins played college basketball at the University of Colorado, with the Colorado Buffaloes, from 2007 to 2011. He is tied with Richard Roby, with 2,001 career points, as the all-time leading scorer for the Buffaloes, and he is sixth all-time in scoring Big 12 Conference history.

Professional career
After going undrafted in 2011 NBA draft, Higgins was selected with the seventh pick, in 2011 D-League Draft, by the Erie BayHawks. He appeared in five games with the team, averaging 12.6 points.

Higgins was invited to the Denver Nuggets training camp, during the 2011 preseason, but on December 23, 2011, he was waived.

On December 25, 2011, he was claimed off the waivers by the Charlotte Bobcats. He was waived by the Bobcats on December 9, 2012. On January 16, 2013, Higgins was reacquired by the Erie BayHawks.

In October 2013, he signed a one-year deal with Triumph Lyubertsy of Russia.

In June 2014, he signed a one-year deal with Royal Halı Gaziantep of Turkey.

On July 1, 2015, Higgins signed a one-year contract, with an option for a second year, with the Russian club CSKA Moscow. Following a successful season, CSKA used its team option to keep Higgins in the club for yet another season. On June 26, 2017, CSKA announced that they had renewed their contract with Higgins, for an additional two years.

On July 3, 2019, Higgins signed a three-year deal with the Spanish club FC Barcelona. During the 2020–21 season, he averaged 13.1 points and 2.4 assists per game. Higgins signed a three-year extension with the team on July 5, 2021.

Personal
His father, Rod Higgins, is a former NBA player and the former president of the basketball operations for the Charlotte Bobcats. He majored in sociology. His godfather is former Chicago Bulls guard Michael Jordan.

Career statistics

"As of October 20, 2020"
|-
| align="left" | 2011–12
| align="left" | Charlotte Hornets
| NBA
| 38|| 11.1 || .325 || .200 || .700 || .9 || .9 || .1 || .2|| 3.9
|-
| align="left" | 2012–13
| align="left" | Charlotte Hornets
| NBA
| 6 || 5.3 || .316 || .200|| .500 || .5 || .8 || .5 || .0 || 2.3
|-class=sortbottom
| align="center" colspan=2 | Career
| NBA
| 44 || 10.3 || .324 || .200 || .694 || .9 || .9 || .2 || .1 || 3.7
|-
| align="left" | 2012–13
| align="left" | Erie Bayhawks
| NBA D-League
| 30 || 35.9 || .464 || .370|| .880 || 4.3 || 2.5 || 1.3 || .3 || 18.5
|-
| align="left" | 2013–14
| align="left" | Triumph Lyubertsy
| VTB United League
| 22 || 32.5 || .467 || .379 || .859 || 4.0 || 3.5 || 1.1 || .2 || 20.3
|-
| style="text-align:left| 2015–16
| style="text-align:left;" rowspan=2| CSKA Moscow
| EuroLeague
| 29 || 21.0 || .506 || .540 || .821 || 2.2 || 1.4 || .6 || .2 || 9.2 
|-
| style="text-align:left;"| 2016–17
| EuroLeague
| 32 || 20.4 || .467 || .403 || .879 || 2.2 || 1.5 || .8 || .1 || 9.5
|-
| style="text-align:left;"| 2017–18
| align="left" | CSKA Moscow
| EuroLeague
| 36 || 24.7 || .542 || .455 || .806 || 2.4 || 1.9 || 1.0 || .1 || 14.2 
|-
| style="text-align:left;"| 2017–18
| align="left" | CSKA Moscow
| VTB United League
| 27 || 20.7 || .478 || .393 || .896 || 1.6 || 2.2 || 1.2 || .1 || 11.3 
|-
| style="text-align:left| 2018–19
| align="left"| CSKA Moscow
| EuroLeague
| 32 || 25.4 || .492 || .490 || .897 || 2.2 || 1.8 || .4 || .3 || 14.9
|-
| style="text-align:left| 2019–20
| align="left" | FC Barcelona Basquet
| EuroLeague
| 23 || 26.6 || .454 || .400 || .817 || 2.1 || 2.8 || .7 || .1 || 12.4
|-class=sortbottom
| align="center" colspan=2 | Career
| All Leagues
| 275 || 23.0 || .472 || .419 || .849 || 2.3 || 1.9 || .8 || .2 || 12.1

References

External links
Cory Higgins at acb.com 

 
 Cory Higgins at draftexpress.com
 Cory Higgins at eurobasket.com
 Cory Higgins at euroleague.net
 Cory Higgins at fibaeurope.com
 Cory Higgins at fiba.com
 

1989 births
Living people
American expatriate basketball people in Russia
American expatriate basketball people in Spain
American expatriate basketball people in Turkey
American men's basketball players
Basketball players from California
BC Zenit Saint Petersburg players
Charlotte Bobcats players
Colorado Buffaloes men's basketball players
Erie BayHawks (2008–2017) players
FC Barcelona Bàsquet players
Gaziantep Basketbol players
Liga ACB players
PBC CSKA Moscow players
People from Danville, California
Point guards
Shooting guards
Small forwards
Sportspeople from the San Francisco Bay Area
Undrafted National Basketball Association players